The boys' singles tournament of the 2019 Badminton Asia Junior Championships will be held from 24 to 28 July. Lakshya Sen from India clinched this title in the last edition.

Seeds
Seeds were announced on 2 July.

 Kunlavut Vitidsarn (champion)
 Christian Adinata (second round)
 Syabda Perkasa Belawa (third round)
 Liu Liang (final)
 Li Yunze (semifinals)
 Park Hyeon-seung (quarterfinals)
 Yonathan Ramlie (third round)
 Bobby Setiabudi (third round)

Draw

Finals

Top half

Section 1

Section 2

Bottom half

Section 3

Section 4

References

External links 
Main Draw

2019 Badminton Asia Junior Championships